Mark Tylor is a former Australian rules footballer who played in the South Australian National Football League (SANFL) for both the  Port Adelaide Football Club and Glenelg Football Club. He played in the 1994 Port Adelaide premiership team and led the club's goal-kicking on three occasions, as well as winning the Ken Farmer Medal in two of those years.

Tylor broke his hand late in the 1992 season, leaving him stranded on 97 goals for the season (his highest season tally) and missing out on the 1992 SANFL Grand Final. Despite missing the last few games of the season, Tylor won the Ken Farmer Medal. Tylor won the Ken Farmer Medal again in 1993, kicking 90 goals.

References

Port Adelaide Football Club (SANFL) players
Port Adelaide Football Club players (all competitions)
Glenelg Football Club players
Australian rules footballers from South Australia
Living people
Year of birth missing (living people)